Kailadevi is a village in Karauli Tehsil, in the Karauli District of the Indian state of Rajasthan. It falls under the Bharatpur Division. It is 26 km south of the district center Karauli, and 146 km from the state capital, Jaipur.

Places nearby

Nearby villages include:

 Atewa ( 10 km )
 Gerai ( 9 km ) 
 Semarda ( 11 km ) 
 Rajor ( 13 km ) 
 Hariya Ka Mandir ( 12 km ) 
 Boyikra ( 10km ) 

Kailadevi is in Karauli District, with Tehsil and Gangapur City, Tehsil to the North, Bamanwas, Tehsil to the West and Nadauti, Tehsil to the North.

Sabalgarh, Lalsot, Sawai Madhopur and Todabhim are the nearest cities.

Transport and connectivity 

Jaipur Railway Station is the nearest major railway station, 143 km from the village.

Educational Institutions 

Nearby schools include: 

 Government P. G. College Of Karauli
 Pawan A. V. M . Ups Gubreda
 Saups Kaladavi
 Gyandhara Ss Megjeen A
 Hb Aups Keshree Shingh Kepura

References

Villages in Karauli district